St. Louis is a village in the Canadian province of Saskatchewan within the Rural Municipality of St. Louis No. 431 and Census Division No. 15. It is south of the City of Prince Albert and northeast of Batoche.

It was founded by Métis settlers in the late 19th century, and is the northernmost Southbranch Settlement, a series of communities which range from Fish Creek in the south along the South Saskatchewan River through Batoche and St. Laurent to St. Louis.

The village is known also for the St. Louis light, a supposed paranormal anomaly.

History 
St. Louis incorporated as a village on May 19, 1959.

St. Louis is home to a large archaeological site of Indigenous artifacts predating those found at Wanuskewin near Saskatoon, Saskatchewan. Key discoveries at the site have included new species of wolf and buffalo approximately 25% larger than modern species and a bead that indicates decoration of clothing about 1000 years earlier than previously thought.

St. Louis is just northeast of South Branch House, one of many small trading posts from fur trading days; this post was attacked and burnt by the Atsina in the 18th century, in retaliation for the company's supplying their enemies the Cree and Assiniboine with guns and goods.

Geography 
The nearest community of size is Prince Albert, a twenty-seven-minute drive to the north. St. Louis is located near the intersection of Highway 2 north–south and Highway 25; Highway 2 used to run through the village, but now bypasses it several kilometres to the east. The grid road Highway 782 continues westerly along the South Saskatchewan River to arrive at Duck Lake.

Demographics 

Attractions 
St. Louis is known also for its St. Louis light, a supposed paranormal anomaly, the historic St. Louis Bridge and the picturesque beauty of the South Saskatchewan River. A large bison sculpture of an extinct species that was 25% larger than modern bison is on display. The sculpture was the last work of Ralph Berg, who created other monumental pieces in Saskatchewan and Manitoba.

Notable people 
 Howard Adams (1921–2001), academic and activist
 John B. Boucher (1938–2010), politician
 Maxime Lepine (1837–1897), politician and entrepreneur
 Rich Pilon (born 1968), former ice hockey player
 Joey Tetarenko (born 1978), former ice hockey player
 Louis Schmidt (1844–1935), politician

See also 
 List of communities in Saskatchewan

References

External links 
 

Villages in Saskatchewan
St. Louis No. 431, Saskatchewan
Division No. 15, Saskatchewan
Populated places on the South Saskatchewan River